Christopher McDougall (born 1962) is an American author and journalist.  He is best known for his 2009 book Born to Run: A Hidden Tribe, Superathletes, and the Greatest Race the World Has Never Seen. He has also written for Esquire, The New York Times Magazine, Outside, Men's Journal, and New York, and was a contributing editor for Men's Health.

Biography
McDougall resides in Peach Bottom, Pennsylvania, a town located within Fulton Township.

Born to Run

In 2009's Born to Run,  McDougall tracks down members of the reclusive Tarahumara Indian tribe in the Mexican Copper Canyons. After being repeatedly injured as a runner himself, McDougall marvels at the tribe's ability to run ultra distances (over 100 miles) at incredible speeds, without getting the routine injuries of most American runners. The book has received attention in the sporting world for McDougall's description of how he overcame injuries by modeling his running after the Tarahumara. He asserts that modern cushioned running shoes are a major cause of running injury, pointing to the thin sandals called huaraches worn by Tarahumara runners, and the explosion of running-related injuries since the introduction of modern running shoes in 1972.

Natural Born Heroes
In the Natural Born Heroes (2015), McDougall explores various aspects of heroes and physical fitness, covering the abduction of a Nazi general during World War II, parkour, and various other challenging situations.

Works
 Girl Trouble: The True Saga of Superstar Gloria Trevi and the Secret Teenage Sex Cult That Stunned the World (2004)
 Born to Run: A Hidden Tribe, Superathletes, and the Greatest Race the World Has Never Seen (2009)
 Natural Born Heroes: How a Daring Band of Misfits Mastered the Lost Secrets of Strength and Endurance (2015)
 Running with Sherman: The Donkey with the Heart of a Hero (2019). .

See also
 Scott Jurek
 Erwan Le Corre, a natural movement instructor featured in Natural Born Heroes
 Persistence hunting
 Jenn Shelton
 Micah True, an ultrarunner who appears in Born to Run under his nickname "Caballo Blanco"
 Curtis Imrie, pack burro racer described in Born to Run

References

External links
 Website and blog of Christopher McDougall

1962 births
American male journalists
American non-fiction writers
Associated Press reporters
Harvard University alumni
Kent School alumni
Living people
People from Lancaster County, Pennsylvania